Demaine or de Maine is a surname. Notable people with the surname include:

Erik Demaine (born 1981), Canadian computer scientist, son of Martin
Martin Demaine (born 1942), American artist and computer scientist, father of Erik
Mike Demaine (born 1948), Australian footballer (Australian rules)
Paul A. D. de Maine (1924–1999), American computer scientist
Robert deMaine (born 1969), American cellist
William Demaine (1859–1939), Australian politician
David Demaine (born 1942), English footballer

See also
Demaine, Saskatchewan, hamlet in Saskatchewan, Canada